Joseph W. Savage TOR (April 29, 1887 – July 26, 1961) was an American football coach and a member of the Third Order of Saint Francis within the Catholic Church. He served as the head football coach at Saint Francis College—now known as Saint Francis University—in Loretto, Pennsylvania from 1911 to 1912 and in 1917 and 1919.

References

External links
 

1887 births
1961 deaths
Saint Francis Red Flash football coaches
Members of the Third Order of Saint Francis
Coaches of American football from Pennsylvania